Kenneth Scott Mullen (born January 17, 1975) is a former pitcher in Major League Baseball. He played for the Kansas City Royals and Los Angeles Dodgers from 2000 to 2003.

Mullen played college baseball at The Citadel, The Military College of South Carolina and Dallas Baptist University. In 1995, he played collegiate summer baseball with the Wareham Gatemen of the Cape Cod Baseball League.

Mullen was drafted in the seventh round (199th overall) of the  MLB Draft by the Kansas City Royals. He pitched primarily for the Dodgers minor league team in 2003, but spent part of the year in the majors.

References

External links

1975 births
Living people
Baseball players from Texas
Major League Baseball pitchers
Dallas Baptist Patriots baseball players
The Citadel Bulldogs baseball players
Kansas City Royals players
Los Angeles Dodgers players
American expatriate baseball players in Japan
Yokohama BayStars players
Yomiuri Giants players
Spokane Indians players
Lansing Lugnuts players
Wilmington Blue Rocks players
Wichita Wranglers players
Omaha Golden Spikes players
Omaha Royals players
Las Vegas 51s players
Tacoma Rainiers players
Richmond Braves players
Wareham Gatemen players
People from San Benito, Texas